Górka  is a village in the administrative district of Gmina Brodnica, within Śrem County, Greater Poland Voivodeship, in west-central Poland.

History

The first known written records of the village come from 1321. During the 1420s, Dobrogost of Dzwonowo was the owner of Górka.

Górka used to be a clergy village, as property of the chapter of the Poznań Cathedral. By the 1700s, Górka was located in the Kościan District, within the Poznań Voivodeship, Poland-Lithuania.

The village has a population of 260.

References

Villages in Śrem County